Yanase may refer to:

 Yanase (surname), a Japanese surname
 Yanase (car dealership), a Japanese dealership retailer of imported United States and European vehicles to Japan
 Yanase Station, a railway station in Asago, Hyōgo Prefecture, Japan
 46643 Yanase, a main-belt asteroid